B.L.D.E.A's V.P. Dr.P.G.Halakatti College of Engineering and Technology was established by the Bijapur Lingayath District Education Association, Bijapur in the year 1980. It owes its name to Dr. P.G. Halakatti.  It offers nine undergraduate programs besides research programs in two disciplines. It is affiliated to Visvesvaraya Technological University (VTU) in Belgaum and its undergraduate programs are accredited by the National Board of Accreditation (NBA) of the All India Council for Technical Education (AICTE).

Introduction 
The college is recognized by the AICTE (New Delhi) and approved by the Government of Karnataka.  It is recognized as an authorized institute to transfer the technology and courses offered by the joint collaboration of VTU Belgaum. Recently NBA inspection has been done.

Courses
The institute offers the following undergraduate courses recognized by AICTE, the Government of Karnataka and affiliated to Visvesvaraya Technological University

Undergraduate Courses

 Electronics and Communication Engineering (1983)
 Information Science and Engineering (2000)
 Computer Science and Engineering (1986)
 Electrical And Electronics Engineering (1980)
 Mechanical Engineering (1980)
 Automobile Engineering (1986)
 Civil Engineering (1980)
 Architecture (1991)

Postgraduate Courses

 Computer Science and Engineering
 Structural Engineering
 Thermal Engineering
 Design Engineering
 Microelectronics and Control system Engineering

It also has M.C.A. and M.B.A. departments.

References

Affiliates of Visvesvaraya Technological University
Engineering colleges in Karnataka
Universities and colleges in Bijapur district